Events in the year 2020 in Kerala

Incumbents

Events

January 

 11 January - two Apartment complexes namely  (Holy Faith Builders and Developers Pvt Ltd) and Alfa Serene (Alfa Ventures Private Ltd) based in Kochi were demolished following Maradu apartments demolition order by Supreme Court of India.
12 January - the last two among the four to be demolished apartments in Kochi namely Jains Coral Cove(Jain Housing and Construction Ltd) and Golden Kayaloram (KP Varkey & VS Builders) demolished following Maradu apartments demolition order by Supreme Court of India. These apartments were built by violating Coastal Regulation Zone rules.
26 January - 2020 Kerala human chain as part of Citizenship Amendment Act protests.

February 

 4 Feb - Government of Kerala declares Coronavirus infection a state calamity after the reporting of third case in the state from Kannur district.
 13 Feb - A Wuhan returned COVID-19 patient from Government T D Medical College, Alappuzha becomes the first patient in India to recover from the illness fully.
 28 Feb - Dead body of six-year-old girl Devananda, who went missing from Kollam district found in Ithikkara River near her home.

March 

 23 Mar - Kerala reports 30 new cases of COVID-19 and subsequently  a lockdown announced in state till March 31 to contain the spread of virus.
 28 Mar - First COVID-19 death recorded in Kerala. Yakub Hussain Sait, 69, died at the Government Medical College, Ernakulam.
 29 Mar - Hundreds of migrant labourers stage protests in Payippad, Kottayam district defying COVID-19 lockdown.

April 

 21 April - A sixteen year old boy killed using axe by his school mates near Kodumon, Pathanamthitta district.

May 

 7 May - A twenty one year old Novitiate found killed at Baselian Convent of the Syro-Malankara Catholic Church at Thiruvalla.

July 

 5 July - 2020 Kerala gold smuggling case

August 

 19 August - Kerala's COVID-19 tally breaches 50,000 mark.
 24 August - A Motion of no confidence moved against First Vijayan ministry defeated 87 - 40.
28 August - A multi crore Ponzi scheme scam to the tune if 2000 crores conducted by Popular Finance, Konni, Kerala detected by Kerala Police owners apprehended from Indira Gandhi International Airport.

September 

 19 September - National Investigation Agency arrests nine Al-Qaeda operatives from among Migrant labourers at Ernakulam district.

October 

 29 October - Bineesh Kodiyeri, son of Communist Party of India (Marxist) leader, Kodiyeri Balakrishnan was arrested by Enforcement Directorate in Bangalore in connection with 2020 Bengaluru drug raids.

November 

 14 November - Peoples Democratic Party vice chairman Poonthura Siraj quits PDP and joins Indian National League ahead of local elections. However the Left Democratic Front denied him ticket to contest in Thiruvananthapuram Corporation.

December 

 8 December - First phase of 2020 Kerala local elections.
 16 December - LDF bags more than half of all gram panchayats, two-thirds of district panchayats and in four out of six municipal corporations in  local elections.

Deaths

April 

 7 April - Sasi Kalinga, 59, actor.
 25 April - Ravi Vallathol, 67, actor.

May 

 18 May - M. P. Veerendra Kumar, 82, politician and writer.

July 

 30 July - Anil Murali, 56, actor.

October 

 15 Oct - Akkitham Achuthan Namboothiri, 94, Poet and Jnanpith Award winner.

December 

 12 Dec - U. A. Khader, 85, author.

See also 

 2021 in Kerala

References 

2020s in Kerala